Pavlo Vitaliyovich Borysenko (born 4 June 1987) is a Ukrainian-Romanian ice hockey player.

He started out playing for Sokil Kyiv in the 2001/2002 season before moving to North America for spells in the junior leagues, first in the Eastern Junior Hockey League with the Bridgewater Bandits and then in the Quebec Major Junior Hockey League with the Acadie-Bathurst Titan.  He then played in the Vysshaya Liga in Russia for Kristall Saratov and then played in the Belarusian Hockey League for HK Vitebsk before moving to Liepaja in 2006. Internationally Borysenko first played for the Ukrainian national junior team and Ukrainian national team, though he became a naturalised Romanian citizen and made his debut for the Romanian national team in 2019.

References

External links

1987 births
Acadie–Bathurst Titan players
Beibarys Atyrau players
HC Berkut players
HC Donbass players
HK Liepājas Metalurgs players
Living people
Steaua Rangers players
Ukrainian ice hockey left wingers
HK Vitebsk players
Romanian ice hockey centres
Ukrainian expatriate sportspeople in Romania
Ukrainian expatriate ice hockey people
Naturalised citizens of Romania
Sportspeople from Chernihiv
Ukrainian expatriate sportspeople in Russia
Expatriate ice hockey players in Russia
Ukrainian expatriate sportspeople in Belarus
Expatriate ice hockey players in Belarus
Ukrainian expatriate sportspeople in Lithuania
Expatriate ice hockey players in Latvia
Ukrainian expatriate sportspeople in Canada
Expatriate ice hockey players in Canada
Ukrainian expatriate sportspeople in the United States
Expatriate ice hockey players in the United States
Ukrainian expatriate sportspeople in Kazakhstan
Expatriate ice hockey players in Kazakhstan